Chipotle–First Solar Development Team was an American UCI Continental cycling team that existed from 2006 to 2012. Many notable cyclists such as Steele Von Hoff, Andrei Krasilnikau, Robbie Squire and Lachlan Morton rode for the team.

References

UCI Continental Teams (America)
Cycling teams established in 2006
Cycling teams disestablished in 2012
Cycling teams based in the United States